Saint-Louis (Lorraine Franconian: Sînt-Lui) is a commune in the Moselle department in Grand Est in north-eastern France.

See also
 Communes of the Moselle department
 Saint-Louis-Arzviller inclined plane

References

External links
 

Saintlouis